Andromache Karakatsanis (born October 3, 1955) is a Canadian jurist. She was nominated to the Supreme Court of Canada by Stephen Harper in October 2011. She is the first Greek-Canadian judge on the Court.

Early life
Karakatsanis was born in Toronto, Ontario, to Greek parents, and raised with an emphasis on her Greek heritage. She grew up near the Don Mills Road and Lawrence Avenue area of Toronto, where her parents owned a restaurant called Top of the Mall which was where Karakatsanis worked as a hostess and helped her father manage the restaurant.

She attended Victoria College at the University of Toronto, graduating with a B.A. in English literature in 1977. She then attended York University's Osgoode Hall Law School, receiving her LL.B. in 1980. She was called to the Ontario bar in 1982.

Career
After her call to the bar, Karakatsanis clerked for the judges of the Ontario Court of Appeal from 1982–1983, after which she entered private practice. In 1987, Karakatsanis was appointed to the Liquor Licensing Board of Ontario as Vice-Chair, becoming Chair and CEO the following year. She held that position until her 1995 appointment as Assistant Deputy Attorney General and Secretary of the Ontario Native Affairs Secretariat.  Karakatsanis was named Deputy Attorney General for the province of Ontario in 1997, and she became Secretary of the Cabinet and Clerk of the Executive Council of the Government of Ontario in 2000.

Karakatsanis's judicial career began when she was appointed to the Ontario Superior Court of Justice in December 2002, where she developed an expertise in administrative law.  She was subsequently elevated to the Ontario Court of Appeal on March 26, 2010, where she served for 19 months prior to her appointment to the Supreme Court.

Honours
In 2015, she was made a Grand Commander of the Order of Honour by the Government of Greece.

Personal life
Karakatsanis is fluent in English, French and Greek. She is married to former lawyer Tom Karvanis, who lives with multiple sclerosis, and has two children: Paul Karvanis, who is counsel at Hudson's Bay Company, and Rhea Karvanis, a graduate of the University of Toronto law school.

See also
 Reasons of the Supreme Court of Canada by Justice Karakatsanis

References

External links

Court of Appeal biography

1955 births
Living people
Justices of the Court of Appeal for Ontario
Justices of the Supreme Court of Canada
University of Toronto alumni
Osgoode Hall Law School alumni
Grand Commanders of the Order of Honour (Greece)
Canadian people of Greek descent
Canadian women judges
People from Toronto
21st-century Canadian judges
21st-century women judges